Star Trek: The Next Generation is an American science fiction television series which aired in syndication from September 1987 through May 1994. It is the second live-action series of the Star Trek franchise and comprises a total of 176 (DVD and original broadcast) or 178 (syndicated) episodes over 7 seasons. The series picks up about 95 years after the original series is said to have taken place. The television episodes are listed here in chronological order by original air date, which match the episode order in each season's DVD set.

The main cast consisted of Patrick Stewart as captain Jean-Luc Picard, Jonathan Frakes as his second-in-command William Riker, Brent Spiner as chief of operations Data, LeVar Burton as chief engineer Geordi La Forge, Marina Sirtis as counselor Deanna Troi, Michael Dorn as chief of security Worf, and Gates McFadden as Dr. Beverly Crusher. McFadden left the show after the first season and was replaced for the second season with Diana Muldaur as Dr. Katherine Pulaski, but returned for the third season and remained with the cast thereafter. Wil Wheaton starred as Wesley Crusher in seasons 1–4, returning for guest appearances in seasons 5 and 7. Denise Crosby played chief security officer Tasha Yar in the first season but her character was killed in the episode "Skin of Evil", returning for a guest appearance in season 3. 

The Next Generation cast also appears in four feature films: Generations, First Contact, Insurrection, and Nemesis.

Series overview

Episodes
Both the series' premiere ("Encounter at Farpoint") and finale ("All Good Things...") originally aired as single two-hour presentations, but have since aired as two one-hour episodes.

Season 1 (1987–1988)

Season 2 (1988–1989)

Season 3 (1989–1990)

Season 4 (1990–1991)

Season 5 (1991–1992)

Season 6 (1992–1993)

Season 7 (1993–1994)

Home media
The series was released on VHS cassette tapes, usually with two episodes or a two-part episode on one tape. For some releases the credits of both shows on the tape were combined at the end rather than shown separately.

DVD and Blu-ray

Certain episodes of the series have also been released on eight "best of" collections.

The four Next Generation movies were released together on a Blu-ray set in 2009. They have subsequently been re-released individually.

Three episodes were released on region-free Blu-ray Disc in January 2012. The complete series was digitally remastered in 1080p high definition to be available for Blu-ray releases, syndication on television, and distribution digitally.

Five "Fan Collective" DVD collections were released, each including episodes with a particular theme – Borg, Klingon, Q, Time Travel, and Captain's Log – from the first five live-action Star Trek series, including The Next Generation.

Streaming
The digital distribution of the remastered series has been through services such as iTunes and Amazon Video. Seasons 1 and 2 were released on the US, Canadian and UK iTunes stores in early 2013, in both high and standard definition. Seasons 3 and 4 were released on the US and Canadian iTunes stores in the second half of 2013, and on the UK store in March 2014 - again in both high and standard definition. In early 2014, the first four seasons were added to the Australian iTunes Store in both high and standard definition. Both high and standard definition versions of Season 5 were released digitally in the US via Amazon Video and iTunes in early May 2014, and later in the UK, Canadian and Australian iTunes stores. In December 2014, Season 6 was added in both high and standard definition to the US iTunes Store.

The complete series was added to the Netflix streaming service in the US in 2011. In 2015, the series was updated to the high-definition remastered version of the show. Although the series was available to subscribers on Netflix, Hulu, and Amazon Prime for a number of years, after Paramount launched its own streaming service, it stopped renewing streaming rights to the Star Trek series, and by early 2022, The Next Generation was available for streaming only from Paramount+.

See also

 Lists of Star Trek episodes

Notes

References

Bibliography

External links

 Memory Alpha – a Star Trek wiki containing detailed episode guides
 Episode guide  at startrek.com
 

Next Generation, The
 
Lists of American science fiction television series episodes